Edmund March Wheelwright (September 14, 1854 – August 15, 1912) was one of New England's most important architects in the late nineteenth and early twentieth centuries, and served as city architect for Boston, Massachusetts from 1891–1895.

Early life and career 
Wheelwright was born in Roxbury, Massachusetts, educated at Roxbury Latin School and graduated from Harvard University in 1876. He studied architecture at the Massachusetts Institute of Technology and later in Europe, after which he worked in the offices of Peabody and Stearns and of firms in New York and Albany.

In 1883 he started a business of his own and afterwards became a member of the firm of Wheelwright & Haven, more recently Wheelwright, Haven & Hoyt.

In June 1887, Wheelwright married Elizabeth Boott Brooks. His son was the poet John Brooks Wheelwright.

In 1893 Wheelwright and R. Clipston Sturgis were chosen by the trustees of the Museum of Fine Arts, Boston to spend a year studying art museums throughout Europe; they later contributed to the ongoing design of the museum's building on Huntington Avenue.

Wheelwright, who designed the Harvard Lampoon Building, also oversaw the construction. It was first opened on February 19, 1909. Wheelwright while attending Harvard University was one of the founders of the Harvard Lampoon.  Wheelwright's design was inspired in part by an old church in Jamestown, Virginia, and by the Flemish Renaissance details of Auburn Street buildings in its vicinity.

He was a fellow of the American Institute of Architects, serving on its board of directors from 1892-1894 and 1898-1900, as well as a fellow of the Boston Society of Architects. He published two books on school architecture: "The American Schoolhouse" and "School Architecture."

Charles Donagh Maginnis had been his apprentice.

After suffering a nervous breakdown from overwork, he lived at a Thompsonville, Connecticut sanitarium for two years before dying on August 14, 1912, at age 57.

Boston's fire tower 
In 1892 Wheelwright designed and built a 156 foot tall tower in the South End of Boston, Massachusetts, which was originally designed as part of the central fire station and used as a fire lookout. Since Wheelwright wanted the building to stand out, it was modeled after the 14th century Torre del Mangia in Siena, Italy, and made of brick like the Italian original. It is the city's only Florentine-inspired building.

Architectural works 
Wheelwright designed the following:

Boston Opera House (1909)
Harvard Lampoon Building
Horticultural Hall
Larz Anderson Auto Museum
Longfellow Bridge
Massachusetts Historical Society building
New England Conservatory's Jordan Hall
Anderson Memorial Bridge
Oak Square School
Margaret Fuller School, Jamaica Plain, Boston (1891–1892) 
Forest Hills station

In addition, he was a consulting architect for:

Boston Museum of Fine Arts
Bulkeley Bridge in Hartford, Connecticut
Cleveland Museum of Art

Firms 
Mid-career, Wheelwright worked as an architect for the firm of McKim, Mead, and White. By 1897 he had formed a partnership and created the firm of "Wheelwright & Haven." This later became "Wheelwright, Haven and Hoyt," and (after Wheelwright's death) "Haven and Hoyt." The firm operated until c. 1930. The Haven and Hoyt Collection at the Boston Public Library holds a variety of materials related to Wheelwright, including renderings and photographs.

Selected publications 
 Wheelwright, Edmund March, School architecture; a general treatise for the use of architects and others, Boston : Rogers & Manson, 1901.
 Wheelwright, Edmund March, Lampy's early days, The Harvard Lampoon Society, 1909

Footnotes

References 
 Walking Tour Guide for Larz Anderson Auto Museum in PDF format
 Boston Public Library Special Collections Department 
 Obituary, Quarterly Bulletin Containing an Index of Literature from the Publications of Architectural Societies and Periodicals on Architecture and Allied Subjects, V. 1-12, V. 13, No. 1-3; January 1, 1900 – October 1, 1912, American Institute of Architects, page 251.
 Marquis, Albert Nelson (ed.), Who's who in New England, Chicago: A. N. Marquis & Company, 1909.

1854 births
1912 deaths
Architects from Boston
The Harvard Lampoon alumni
People from Roxbury, Boston
Roxbury Latin School alumni